Walter Bucher may refer to:

 Walter Hermann Bucher (1888–1965), German-American geologist and paleontologist
 Walter Bucher (cyclist) (born 1926), Swiss cyclist